I Want Candy a song written and originally recorded by The Strangeloves

I Want Candy can also refer to:
I Want Candy, a compilation album by Bow Wow Wow released by EMI in the UK. Released in the US as Twelve Original Recordings.
I Want Candy (album), another compilation album by Bow Wow Wow, released by RCA in the US 
I Want Candy (film), a 2007 British comedy film from Ealing Studios
I Want Candy (D:TNG episode), an episode of the Canadian serial teen drama television series Degrassi: The Next Generation
I Want Candy, a song from the American animated television series Aqua Teen Hunger Force episode MC Pee Pants by MC Chris